Stewartville is a city in Olmsted County, Minnesota, United States. The population was 5,916 at the 2010 census, and was estimated to have grown to a population of 6,125 as of 2018. Stewartville has experienced growth as a result of its location just south of Rochester.

History
Stewartville was founded in the 1850s by Charles Stewart, and named for him. A post office has been in operation at Stewartville since 1858.

Geography

U.S. Route 63 and Minnesota State Highway 30 are two of the main routes in the city.

Interstate 90 is immediately north and west of Stewartville.

Stewartville is part of the Rochester, MN Metropolitan Statistical Area.

Demographics

2010 census
As of the census of 2010, there were 5,916 people, 2,318 households, and 1,596 families living in the city. The racial makeup of the city was 97.5% White, 0.5% African American, 0.2% Native American, 0.5% Asian, 0.4% from other races, and 0.9% from two or more races. Hispanic or Latino of any race were 1.5% of the population.

There were 2,318 households, of which 38.1% had children under the age of 18 living with them, 53.3% were married couples living together, 11.4% had a female householder with no husband present, 4.2% had a male householder with no wife present, and 31.1% were non-families. 25.8% of all households were made up of individuals, and 11.3% had someone living alone who was 65 years of age or older. The average household size was 2.52 and the average family size was 3.02.

The median age in the city was 34.6 years. 28.2% of residents were under the age of 18; 7.6% were between the ages of 18 and 24; 27.8% were from 25 to 44; 22.5% were from 45 to 64; and 14% were 65 years of age or older. The gender makeup of the city was 47.5% male and 52.5% female.

2000 census
As of the census of 2000, there were 5,411 people, 2,013 households, and 1,417 families living in the city. The racial makeup of the city was 97.10% White, 0.70% African American, 0.30% Native American, 0.52% Asian, 0.02% Pacific Islander, 0.33% from other races, and 1.03% from two or more races. Hispanic or Latino of any race were 1.00% of the population.

There were 2,013 households, out of which 41.8% had children under the age of 18 living with them, 55.9% were married couples living together, 10.7% had a female householder with no husband present, and 29.6% were non-families. 23.8% of all households were made up of individuals, and 9.7% had someone living alone who was 65 years of age or older.  The average household size was 2.61 and the average family size was 3.13.

In the city, the population was spread out, with 30.2% under the age of 18, 8.2% from 18 to 24, 30.6% from 25 to 44, 19.2% from 45 to 64, and 11.8% who were 65 years of age or older.  The median age was 33 years. For every 100 females, there were 89.5 males.  For every 100 females age 18 and over, there were 85.2 males.

The median income for a household in the city was $44,135, and the median income for a family was $52,037. Males had a median income of $34,162 versus $24,838 for females. The per capita income for the city was $18,780.  About 2.9% of families and 5.4% of the population were below the poverty line, including 4.2% of those under age 18 and 14.8% of those age 65 or over.

Notable people
John Robert Beach, farmer and Minnesota state legislator
Jill Billings, Wisconsin State Assembly
John Paul Goode, a geographer and cartographer
Jason Hammel, half of Indie-Pop duo Mates of State
David C. Hodge, president of Miami University
Richard Warren Sears, founder of Sears, Roebuck & Company

Climate
The Köppen Climate Classification subtype for this climate is "Dfb" (Warm Summer Continental Climate).

References

Cities in Minnesota
Cities in Olmsted County, Minnesota
Rochester metropolitan area, Minnesota